Macroglossum fischeri is a moth of the  family Sphingidae. It is known from Vietnam.

References

Macroglossum
Moths described in 2009